This is a list of characters from the 36th Super Sentai series Tokumei Sentai Go-Busters.

Main characters

Go-Busters

The  is a spy team formed under the EMC's Special Operations Unit to combat the threat of Vaglass and prevent the theft of Enetron-related supplies using their . In the middle of their campaign against Vaglass, the Go-Busters are joined by Masato Jin and Beet J. Stag as additional members despite their tendency to operate on independent terms.

The primary Go-Busters transform through their  and can summon their weapons through the left shoulder-mounted .

Inversely, the secondary Go-Busters transform through the  cellphone/handgun, with their secondary weapon being the  sword, which doubles as their Buster Machines' steering mechanisms. During their final battle with Enter, the Go-Busters perform the  finisher, an enhanced version of Red Buster's Volcanick Attack.

In an alternate timeline where Messiah never came to exist, depicted in the V-Cinema special Tokumei Sentai Go-Busters Returns vs. Doubutsu Sentai Go-Busters, the Go-Busters became the animal-themed  to combat the Mechalius Empire.

Hiromu Sakurada
Thirteen years prior to the series, Hiromu's parents worked at the Transport Research Center as its head and a researcher respectively before they sacrificed themselves to trap Messiah in subspace. As a result, Hiromu was entrusted to take care of his sister Rika. After training with his Buddyloid, Cheeda Nick, and promising Yoko Usami to get everyone who was lost back, Hiromu resolved to become a Go-Buster to ensure no one else would lose a loved one to Messiah again. Initially putting his missions first, Hiromu refuses to see Rika despite Nick's efforts at repairing their relationship, though the latter eventually succeeds. Upon learning that his parents were turned into extensions of Messiah, Hiromu escalates his feud with Enter and, with help from his teammates, overcomes his Weakpoint before learning the 13th Messiah Card is in his body. Hiromu attempts to kill himself to deny Enter his back-up, but the card protects him from harm, including self-inflicted harm. After Masato Jin sacrifices himself to take Hiromu's place and the Go-Busters' final battle with Enter, Hiromu lives peacefully with Nick and Rika.

As a result of his anti-Metavirus program, Hiromu possesses superhuman speed, but his Weakpoint causes him to freeze whenever he sees or hears anything chicken-related due to his alektorophobia, which he developed after being trapped in a chicken coop for a night as a child. Despite this, Hiromu sees his and his teammates' Weakpoints as a factor that encourages them to work as a team, as he gradually overcomes this handicap on certain occasions. As , Hiromu gains increased speed and can perform the  finisher.

Ryuji Iwasaki
As a child living near an EMC facility that employed Megazords, Iwasaki aspired to become an engineer, but was forced to give up his dream and become a Go-Buster following the Messiah incident. As the oldest of the original three, he feels that it his duty to watch over his teammates and mediate when they get into arguments, having dedicated his training to keeping pace with Hiromu and Yoko. Despite this, Iwasaki lacks a personal reason for fighting Vaglass, initially preferring to support his teammates from the sidelines until Masato Jin prompts Iwasaki to find a reason. Following the Go-Busters' final battle with Enter, Iwasaki resumes and fulfills his childhood dream.

As a result of his anti-Metavirus program, Iwasaki possesses superhuman strength, but his Weakpoint makes him more susceptible to heat than a regular person, which makes him angry and irritable. If he uses his power for extended periods of time, his body will overheat, his strength will increase exponentially, and his personality will shift towards a murderous berserker incapable of distinguishing friend from foe until he eventually "shuts down" or is exposed to large amounts of water, ice, and/or a special cooling cream the EMC developed for him. As , Iwasaki gains increased strength, the ability to analyze substances and create a digital copy of it, and perform the  finisher.

Yoko Usami
After losing her mother, Kei Usami, as a toddler during the Messiah incident, Yoko became the most invested in the fight against Vaglass. As a result, she develops a rivalry with Hiromu, who promised her that he would get their family back and fight Vaglass together, only to seemingly forget in her eyes. Though she learns he did keep his promise, she still maintains a love-hate relationship with him. Additionally, due to her personality, she refuses to study, leaving her information processing and critical thinking skills at a disadvantage. Following the Go-Busters' final battle with Vaglass, Yoko enters high school.

As a result of her anti-Metavirus program, Yoko possesses superhuman jumping, but her Weakpoint causes her body's energy and calorie count to deplete quickly with extended use of her power, forcing her to replenish it through numerous sweets to keep herself awake and active. As , she gains increased agility, the ability to use data to manifest objects in the air that she can run or jump on mid-air, and perform the  finisher.

Masato Jin
 is an eccentric and haughty genius engineer who finds minor flaws to be more interesting than perfection. A worker of the Transport Research Center, as well as Kuroki's colleague, then 27-year-old Masato was one of the many victims of the facility's teleportation into subspace 13 years prior to the series. Due to an error in the transportation, only a small fragment of his data was assimilated into Messiah. Masato spent the intervening years in stasis and creating Jay, his avatar body, his own Buster Gears, and the plans for BC-04. In anticipation of the upcoming war against Messiah, he sends Jay to reality so he can hone the Go-Busters' skills and join them in battle as the gold-colored .

Though Masato is considered a part of the Go-Busters, his disregard for rules and authority often puts him at odds with the EMC's chain of command. Nevertheless, he is quite wise and willing to put others' well-being above his priorities. As such, he sacrifices all the opportunities given to him in the series to restore his human body to ensure Vaglass' total destruction, switching places with Hiromu as the host of Messiah Card 13 at the cost of his life.

As an avatar, Masato resembles his younger self despite being 40 years old in the present. Since his existence in the real world is entirely dependent on Jay, he cannot transform on his own and requires Jay's Marker System to activate their Buster Machines. While his body in the real world is an avatar and thus incapable of being destroyed, having this avatar body recreated puts a serious strain on Masato's true body.

In addition to the television series, three separate iterations of Masato appear in supplemental media:
In the crossover film Zyuden Sentai Kyoryuger vs. Go-Busters: The Great Dinosaur Battle! Farewell Our Eternal Friends, a copy of Masato's data materializes from Jay as part of an Anti-Vaglass Residual Program created to counter the revival of the Vaglass army. Before disappearing, the Masato copy gives the Go-Busters personalized Zyudenchi to assist the Kyoryugers, Abarangers, and Zyurangers in their fight against Voldos.
During the events of the crossover film Kamen Rider × Super Sentai: Ultra Super Hero Taisen, the Game World iteration of Masato temporarily assumes the form of the yellow-colored , a hybrid of Kirenger and the Double Riders. In this form, he can command the Magirangers' Magi Dragon.

Beet J. Stag
, often simply referred to as "Jay", is Masato's Japanese rhinoceros beetle/stag beetle-esque Buddyloid. Created in subspace by Masato, Jay is sent to reality by stowing away in a Vaglass Megazord that Enter transported. Like Masato, Jay is an egotist who likes appearing cool and often stands in the way of others, annoying whoever he inconveniences. Despite this, he has a very high sense of awareness around himself, allowing him to sense immediate danger, and is very observant, though he does not tell this to the others due to his attitude. Additionally, he has a softer side, as he is fascinated by nature, especially beetles, to the point of becoming melancholic. He also genuinely cares for his creator, going as far as to jeopardize his team's mission in the hopes of recovering a means to restore Masato's physical body. During the Go-Busters' final battle against Enter, Jay is forced to heed Masato's dying wish of destroying Messiah Card 13 at the cost of his creator's physical body, keeping the black block that represented Masato as a memento.

Unlike the other Buddyloids, Jay is battle-ready and outfitted with a  that allows him to recreate Masato's avatar if it is destroyed and activate the duo's personal Buster Machines. Because of this, Jay is effectively Masato's anchor in the real world and the supplier of Beet Buster's suit. He is also Masato's partner both in and out of combat, with the ability to transform into the silver-colored  to actively fight alongside him as Beet Buster. However, Jay is constantly in need of Enetron to sustain himself and behaves in a drunken manner when his energy reserves are depleted. Furthermore, he is not equipped with a vaccine program, which makes him susceptible to Metavirus infection, a trait that will also jeopardize Masato's avatar and the Beet Buster program as a whole.

In Tokumei Sentai Go-Busters Returns vs. Dōbutsu Sentai Go-Busters, Jay exists as an anomaly in the alternate universe wished into existence by Cheeda Nick since his creation never took place in a world where Vaglass was nonexistent.
 

Buster Machines
The  are giant vehicles made of a rare fictional metal called Deltarium 39 and capable of switching between a  mode and a  mode and combining to form Megazords via .

: Hiromu's Buster Machine that possesses a supercar, cheetah, and Megazord mode.
: Iwasaki's Buster Machine that possesses a truck and gorilla mode, the latter which being capable of firing banana missiles.
: Yoko's Buster Machine that possesses a helicopter and rabbit mode.
: An experimental Buster Machine that Jin designed 13 years prior to the series as a means to aid the Go-Busters. Though Enter stole the blueprints to reverse-engineer a Vaglass Megazord before the Buster Machine could be constructed, Jin built the BC-04 Beetle within subspace and uses it as his Buster Machine. BC-04 possesses a crane truck and Japanese rhinoceros beetle mode, the latter of which is capable of siphoning Enetron.
: A Buster Machine that Jin built for Jay and possesses a fighter jet and stag beetle mode, the latter of which is also capable siphoning Enetron.
: The first Buster Machine that Jin designed and possesses a submarine and frog mode, the latter of which can perform the  attack and fire tadpole-esque . This Buster Machine first appears in the film Tokumei Sentai Go-Busters the Movie: Protect the Tokyo Enetower!

Tategami LiOh
 is a sentient  created by Professor Hazuki to combine elements of a Megazord and a Buddyloid as well as work alongside Go-Buster Ace. LT-06 possesses an all-terrain Motor trike-like  mode, a lion-like  mode, and a Megazord mode. Additionally, Go-Buster Ace and Beet can ride LT-06 in its vehicle and animal modes.

Megazords
: The combination of Go-Buster Ace and SJ-05 Stag Beetle.
This combination appears exclusively in the crossover film Kamen Rider × Super Sentai: Super Hero Taisen.
: The combination of Go-Buster Ace, GT-02 Gorilla, and FS-0O Frog that is equipped with the arm-mounted  and a missile launcher on its left arm capable of firing . This combination first appears in the film Tokumei Sentai Go-Busters the Movie: Protect the Tokyo Enetower!.
: The combination of the BC-04 Beetle and the SJ-05 Stag Beetle that is equipped with the chest-mounted , the right arm-mounted , and the left arm-mounted , which can also double as a giant pair of scissors, and can perform the  finisher.

Recurring characters

Energy Management Center
The , abbreviated as EMC, is a fictional organization whose  employs the Go-Busters in their fight to keep the fictional energy source  safe from Vaglass.

Buddyloids
The  are sentient robots created by the EMC prior to Messiah's creation assigned to assist the original three Go-Busters in their missions who possess built-in teleportation technology, anti-Metavirus programming, and the ability to interface with the Buster Machines, with their heads forming the control mechanisms. Despite being robots, the Buddyloids are capable of understanding human behavior and behave similarly to humans. While they are initially unable to take part in combat, they later gain the ability to transform into protector armor and fuse with their Go-Buster partners via the GB Custom Visor.

Cheeda Nick
 is Hiromu's fun-loving, lively, and thoughtful cheetah-themed Buddyloid, trainer, and older brother figure with motorcycle handlebars for horns who is capable of transforming into  to assist the latter when his Weakpoint is exploited and typically attempts to help Hiromu be more sociable. Though Nick possesses a powerful supercomputer that allows him to make calculations at super speed and an on-board navigational computer, he has no sense of direction and constantly gets lost due in part to his pride preventing him from asking others for help.

Gorisaki Banana
 is Ryuji's faint of heart and mild-mannered gorilla-themed Buddyloid with a steering wheel for a face who constantly worries about Ryuji and primarily provides back-up for the Go-Busters by serving as a mechanic. Having been paired with Ryuji as a teenager, Gorisaki feels he possesses the weakest bond between him and his partner out of the Buddyloids and as such, holds back while talking to him and resorts to discreet methods such as eavesdropping to understand Ryuji better. After risking his life to protect his partner, Gorisaki and Ryuji improve their partnership, with the latter allowing the former to say what is on his mind without holding back.

Usada Lettuce
, codenamed , is Yoko's sharp-tongued, overbearing, and condescending yet caring rabbit-themed Buddyloid with a pair of control sticks for "ears" and a small, non-humanoid design who serves as a support system via his data management applications. While he is quick to make snide comments to everyone around him and believes Yoko cannot do anything without him, he secretly enjoys company and cares for her as much as she does him.

Ene-tan
 is a small, non-humanoid frog-like Buddyloid with an egotistic mentality similar to that of her creator, Masato Jin, and an aversion to be carelessly touched who first appears in the film Tokumei Sentai Go-Busters the Movie: Protect the Tokyo Enetower!.

Takeshi Kuroki
 is the commanding officer of the Special Operations Unit, leading the Go-Busters and several hundred other staff members. As he was originally the lab assistant of Hiromu's father and a teammate of Masato Jin, Kuroki sees the elimination of Messiah as his main priority.

In an alternate timeline where Messiah never came to exist, depicted in the V-Cinema special Tokumei Sentai Go-Busters Returns vs. Doubutsu Sentai Go-Busters, Kuroki left the EMC after discovering the Mechalius Empire's movements ten years prior and worked with his version of Masato Jin to secretly establish the Doubutsu Sentai Go-Busters, with the EMC's agricultural division's high school as a front and Kuroki working undercover as its principal. When the Mechalius Empire launches their first attack, Kuroki and Masato recruit their versions of Hiromu Sakurada, Ryuji Iwasaki, and Yoko Usami to become their Go-Busters.

Toru Morishita
 is the calm and cool-headed system control operator for the Special Operations Unit.

Miho Nakamura
 is an operator for the Special Operations Unit and a recent hire in the EMC who does not know much about the Go-Busters. While she is well versed in subspace detection, she can snap if she is pushed too hard.

Other members
: An engineer of the Megazord development facility and Ryuji's old high school classmate. Dissatisfied and disillusioned over his job, he betrays the EMC and sells a copy of the BC-04's blueprints to Enter. Though Ryuji manages to remind him of his dreams and convince him to stop, Enter steals the hard disk drive with the blueprints. Guilt-ridden over his mistake, Motomura promises to atone for his crime.
: An eccentric and passionate scientist and a member of the EMC years ago prior to Messiah's creation who created the framework for the Go-Busters' Buster Machines. When he left out of a conflict of interest, Professor Hazuki devised Tategami LiOh and continued working on it up until his death, though he copied his mind into Tategami LiOh's control system.

Vaglass
 is a fictional organization that seeks to make the Earth more suitable for machines and wipe out the human race by tapping into the EMC's Enetron. After being sent into subspace, an alternate dimension where gravity is greater to the point that breathing can be painful and humans become living data, Vaglass leader Messiah resolves to use his Avatars Enter and Escape to gather the vast amount of Enetron needed to re-enter reality and assimilate the Earth to ensure his dominion over it. The Vaglass' base of operations is the ruins of the Transport Research Center (TRC) that ended up in subspace thirteen years prior, which also serves as Messiah's inactive body before it is destroyed with him.

Messiah
 is a powerful yet unintelligent, ill-tempered, single-minded, and impatient entity that originated as a computer virus that infected the TRC's computers on Christmas, 1999 NC and evolved after being exposed to Enetron in the TRC's system. Messiah used his assimilation powers to seize control of the facility's systems and machinery, but the research staff sacrificed themselves to transport the entire compound and themselves into subpace; preventing him from spreading to the world's communication, energy, and defense networks. Due to the nature of subspace, Messiah assimilated the digitized humans and the facility to use their collective intellect as his "engineers" and as source material for Enter and Escape. Thirteen years later, Messiah renews his campaign for global domination by sending his agents across dimensions to gather enough Enetron to return him to reality and assimilate Earth.

After Enter supplies resources from the Living Body Program Research Institute, Messiah evolves further and creates a personal vessel called , which is capable of recreating defeated Metaloids and self-regeneration. Though this form is eventually destroyed by the Go-Busters, Enter makes back-ups of Messiah's data in thirteen Messiah Cards with the intention of making himself an entirely different Messiah. While Escape thwarts this and restores their creator as he originally was by reformatting her personal Megazord into , the Go-Busters use their anti-virus program to destroy him permanently.

Enter
 is Messiah's primary servant and a frivolous and laid-back, yet smart and manipulative Avatar created from the data of several Transport Research Center scientists who is fluent in French, can easily be recreated and disguise himself, and wields cable-like tentacles. He initially conducts espionage tactics to create Metaloids via his laptop and Metavirus cards as well as obtain Enetron for "his Majesty" before focusing his efforts on increasing the number of Metaloids created in order to teleport more Megazords and accelerate his agenda. Following several failed plots, being replaced with Escape, and relegated to Megazord teleportation and Enetron theft, Enter regains favor with Messiah by using the Living Body Program Research Institute's technology to evolve the sentient virus.

Despite failing to protect Messiah's core from destruction, Enter works to create back-ups of Messiah's data while leading Vaglass in his place and becomes more serious in his fight against the Go-Busters. This also leads to Enter attempting to use Hiromu Sakurada's data to fully understand the human spirit and evolve into a new Messiah. To this end, he scatters eleven Messiah Cards to the wind, uses Messiah Card 04 to upgrade himself into an armored form called , and secretly places Messiah Card 13 in Hiromu's body. After Enter reclaims Messiah Card 07 to gain leverage on the Go-Busters and hasten his evolution, he is seemingly destroyed by Escape, but is later recreated with increased power and the ability to merge organic lifeforms with Metaviruses as Messiah Card 13 serves as his personal backup drive. Using the card, Enter copies Hiromu's data to learn everything about him and transform into a dark version of Red Buster called . Upon gaining the ability to assimilate humans, Enter reaches the final stages of his evolution, but the Go-Busters successfully remove Messiah Card 13 from Hiromu. Enter faces the Go-Busters in a final battle, during which he learns he failed to understand humans' greatest strength is their friendship and imperfections before he is permanently destroyed and his victims are restored.

During the events of the crossover film Zyuden Sentai Kyoryuger vs. Go-Busters: The Great Dinosaur Battle! Farewell Our Eternal Friends, a one-time Vaglass restoration program creates a new Enter, who forms an alliance with Voldos, but is destroyed by the Kyoryugers.

: Enter's first personal Megazord that is equipped with flight capabilities and a powerful railgun. After the Go-Busters destroy the first model during the events of the film Tokumei Sentai Go-Busters the Movie: Protect the Tokyo Enetower!, Enter creates two more copies during the series to continue his fight against them, with the second destroyed by Go-Buster Ace while the third is destroyed by Tategami LiOh.
: Enter's second personal Megazord that is equipped with a chest-mounted cannon. After Go-Buster Ace destroys the first model during the events of the crossover film Tokumei Sentai Go-Busters vs. Kaizoku Sentai Gokaiger: The Movie, Enter builds a new model during the series finale to battle the Go-Busters, though it is destroyed by Go-Buster Ace, Buster Hercules, and Go-Buster LiOh.

Escape
 is an emotional yet reserved and cautious female Avatar who was also created from the data of several Transport Research Center scientists, such as Michiko Sakurada, and loyal servant of Messiah, whom she refers to as "Papa". Messiah creates her to cause human suffering and replace Enter following his numerous failed plots. Unlike Enter, Escape wields via twin machine pistols, possesses a tablet with Metavirus "apps", and takes delight in fighting strong opponents, gaining a rival in Blue Buster while under the influence of his Weakpoint.

Following Messiah's destruction, Escape reluctantly serves Enter to revive the former and under threat of deletion. Despite her data being critically damaged while fighting Blue Buster Powered Custom and suffering from software bugs, Escape risks further damage to protect Enter's Messiah Metaloids in the hopes that they will revive Messiah and upgrade herself into an armored form called . Escape eventually betrays Enter upon obtaining Megazord Zeta and learning he had no intent to revive Messiah as he originally was. After seemingly destroying Enter, she resolves to revive Messiah as she remembers him, only to be absorbed by her creator, who deems she outlived her usefulness.

Using his newly acquired ability to create organic Metaloids, Enter uses this to recreate Escape as his servant and incorporate organic life into her data composition to grant her the ability to transform into , which grants a left arm-mounted flower cannon. However, the first three versions prove incomplete and possess limited intelligence and comprehension as Enter used backups of Escape that predate the time of her creation. Due to love-based data he gained from Tiaraloid, Enter became obsessed with creating a perfect copy of Escape. This resulted in him creating a mentally unstable version of her spliced with snake DNA and Escape's data composition being corrupted beyond Enter's ability to repair. Left to her devices and wanting to be like her creator, Escape assimilates various animals and transforms into , gaining a reptilian claw for a right hand. While fighting the Go-Busters, she assimilates the surrounding matter and transforms further into , gaining crow-like wings on her head that allow her to fly, but is eventually destroyed and reverts to her original form. As she dissolves, Blue Buster assures her she made Messiah proud.

During the events of the crossover film Zyuden Sentai Kyoryuger vs. Go-Busters: The Great Dinosaur Battle! Farewell Our Eternal Friends, Escape is recreated as part of Vaglass' one-time restoration program and forms an alliance with Voldos, but is destroyed by Kyoryu Gold.

During the events of the crossover film Uchu Sentai Kyuranger vs. Space Squad, the Space Ninja Demost revives Escape, among others, to help him take over the universe. However, Demost is defeated by the Kyurangers, Space Sheriff Gavan Type G, and Space Sheriff Shaider, causing the ninja's revived servants to return to the afterlife.

: Escape's personal Megazord, which originated as a Type Delta Megazord before she used Messiah Card 06 to reformat it into Messiah's new vessel. It initially proves unstable until Escape adds Messiah Cards 09 and 12 along with a Type Alpha, Beta, and Gamma Megazord so she can turn Megazord Zeta into Messiah Reboot and bring her master back.

Buglers
The  are Vaglass' robotic foot soldiers created by Enter using a  that are capable of piloting giant .

Metaloids
A Metaloid's primary purpose is to serve as a beacon for its corresponding Megazord, though it will teleport within a three kilometer radius of them due to a margin of error in the teleportation process. Enter creates them to fight the Go-Busters, siphon Enetron, and buy time for the Megazords to arrive while Escape creates them to cause as much human suffering as possible.

: A Metaloid that Enter created from an excavator via the  Metavirus who is equipped with a bucket arm. He is sent to attack an Enetron plant, but is destroyed by Blue and Yellow Buster.
: A Metaloid that Enter created from a gas cylinder via the  Metavirus who is equipped with a flamethrower arm. He is sent to create chaos by committing arson, but is destroyed by the Go-Busters.
: A Metaloid that Enter created from a syringe, among other pieces of medical equipment, via the  Metavirus. He is sent to infect humans with Metal Cells to turn into Vaglass' obedient slaves, but is destroyed by Red and Yellow Buster.
: A Metaloid that Enter created from a pizza cutter via the  Metavirus who is equipped with a right arm-mounted saw and several upper back-mounted saws that allow him to attack anywhere so long as he is 30 minutes away. He is sent to distract the Go-Busters while the Cutterzord steals Enetron, but is destroyed by Blue and Yellow Buster.
: A Metaloid that Enter created from a bicycle tire via the  Metavirus who is capable of moving at superhuman speed and controlling vehicles. He is sent to attack an Enetron convoy, but is destroyed by Blue Buster under the effects of his Weakpoint.
: A Metaloid that Enter created from a fire extinguisher and the locker it was in via the  Metavirus who is equipped with a right arm-mounted spray gun capable of spraying acidic mist. He assists Enter in infiltrating the EMC's command center and kill the Go-Busters, but is destroyed by Blue and Yellow Buster.
: A Metaloid that Enter created from an Enetron cargo train via the  Metavirus who is capable of firing train tracks and train wheels from his chest and enhancing his arms with extra armor. He is tasked with siphoning Enetron from the city's wiring systems so Vaglass can create more Metaloids, but is destroyed by the Go-Busters before he can complete his objective.
: A Metaloid that Enter created from a handheld impact drill via the  Metavirus who is equipped with a drill-like agitator on his right arm and four smaller drills on his left arm. He is tasked with infiltrating the EMC's Megazord development center and stealing their blueprints for a new Buster Machine, but is destroyed by Blue Buster.
: A Metaloid that Enter created from a toy pistol that belonged to a -infected boy via the  Metavirus who is capable of moving at superhuman speed. He is tasked with hindering Red Buster's efforts to disrupt Enter's plot to transport a Deltarium 39 crate, but is destroyed by the Go-Buster.
: A Metaloid that Enter created from an electric fan via the  Metavirus who is equipped with arm-mounted blades and a chest-mounted turbine capable of generating powerful gusts. He is tasked with altering Blue Buster's body temperature and aggravate his Weakpoint, but is destroyed by the Go-Buster.
: A Metaloid that Enter created from a video projector via the  Metavirus who is capable of holographically disguising itself and avoid detection while disguised. He is tasked with stealing Hong Kong actress Angie Sue's rare crystal earrings so Vaglass can use them to construct a new Megazord. He succeeds in stealing one for Enter before Copyloid is destroyed by Blue and Yellow Buster.
: A Metaloid that Enter created from a tuba via the  Metavirus. Purposefully making him weak, Enter uses him to mark the Go-Busters with the latter's soundwaves. After Tubaloid successfully marks Red and Blue Buster before the Go-Busters destroy him, Enter infects another tuba with the Hoeru Ver. 2 Metavirus to create , granting him the ability to destroy anything his predecessor marked via his concussive sound blasts and tasking him with taking Yellow Buster hostage. Upon realizing Enter's scheme, the Go-Busters modify their equipment, rescue Yellow Buster, and destroy Tubaloid 2.
: A Metaloid that Enter created from a vacuum cleaner via the  Metavirus who is equipped with the right arm-mounted Enetron Cleaner, which allows him to siphon Enetron from any machine and doubles as a gun. While amassing Enetron, Soujikiloid overpowers the Go-Busters, but is destroyed by Beet and Stag Buster.
: A Metaloid that Enter created from a parabolic antenna via the  Metavirus who is capable of tracking designated targets and firing homing missiles. He is tasked with tracking Beet and Stag Buster for Enter, but is destroyed by Blue and Yellow Buster.
: A Metaloid that Enter created from a fork via the  Metavirus and infused with a tank's worth of Enetron who is equipped with a fork-like trident arm. He is tasked with fighting the Go-Busters, but is destroyed by Beet and Stag Buster.
: A Metaloid that Enter created from an electric drill via the Horu Ver.2 Metavirus. He is tasked with distracting the Go-Busters while Drillzord 2 teleports underground to harvest untapped Enetron, but is destroyed by Yellow and Stag Buster.
: A Metaloid that Enter created from a wrench via the  Metavirus who is equipped with a gun that allows him to instantaneously disassemble any machine. He is tasked with disabling the Buster Machines and Buddyloids, but is destroyed by Red and Beet Buster.
: A Metaloid that Enter created from a movie projector via the  Metavirus who is equipped with a chest-mounted projector capable of creating holograms. At Enter's suggestion, he uses his abilities to trap the Go-Busters in projections of their greatest desires, but is destroyed by Red Buster.
: A Metaloid that Enter created from a dumbbell via the  Metavirus who is equipped with a large weight. A passionate trainer, he uses his dumbbells to force people to exercise against their will, threatening to kill them if they do not follow his fitness program, until he is destroyed by Blue Buster.
: A Metaloid that Escape created from a motorcycle key via the  Metavirus who is equipped with a key arm capable of locking any object. He is tasked with trapping humans as part of Escape's desire to cause human suffering, but is destroyed by Blue, Beet, and Stag Buster.
: A Metaloid that Escape created from a toy magnet via the  Metavirus who is equipped with the Polar Needle headband, which allows him to magnetize anything he hits and cause them to either attract or repel other objects he hit. He is tasked with using his abilities on people until Yellow Buster destroys the headband and all five Go-Busters destroy the Metaloid.
: A Metaloid that Enter created from a cotton candy machine via the  Metavirus who is equipped with cotton candy sticks capable of absorbing Enetron from any machine, such as shots from the Go-Busters' Ichigan Busters. He is tasked with siphoning Enetron from the summer festival to help Enter regain his standing with Messiah, but is destroyed by Blue and Yellow Buster.
He attempts to take control of a television station to spread his abilities across Japan, but is destroyed by Yellow, Beet, and Stag Buster.
: A tiny Metaloid that Enter created from an eraser via the  Metavirus who is capable of erasing data, performing powerful headbutts, and firing a powerful laser. After being abandoned by Enter, who believed the transformation failed, Keshigomuloid attempts to erase the EMC and Buddyloids' data, but is destroyed by Red Buster.
: A Metaloid that Enter created from a bug cage via the  Metavirus who is capable of projecting walls and steel cages. He is tasked with using the Living Body Program Research Institute's surveillance system to turn the facility into a labyrinth so Enter can evolve Messiah, but is destroyed by Red, Yellow, and Stag Buster.
: A Metaloid that Enter created from a spray gun via the  Metavirus who is equipped with a spray gun capable of spraying water-soluble paint capable of altering targets' appearances. He is tasked with distracting Beet Buster from Messiah's attempts to reach the real world and figure out Red Buster's Weakpoint. Sprayloid succeeds in the latter task before he is destroyed by the Go-Busters.
: A Metaloid that Enter created off-screen via the Utsu Ver.2 Metavirus and tasked with destroying the Go-Busters to avenge Messiah's apparent destruction. Despite entering Makuu Space and becoming three times more powerful, he is destroyed by Red Buster and Gavan.
: A Metaloid that Escape created from a satellite dish via the Sagasu Ver.2 Metavirus. Despite this, he is downgraded back to his original form by Enter, who takes the card for himself, and destroyed by the Go-Busters.
: A Metaloid that Enter created from a train car via the Atsumeru Ver. 2 Metavirus in order to infect its corresponding Megazord with Messiah Card 06. The Metaloid is easily destroyed by Yellow Buster.
: A tiny Metaloid that a pair of Buglers accidentally created from mochi via the  Metavirus. Being too small to fight the Go-Busters, he attempts to reach a stove in order to enlarge himself to human size. However, he ends up stuck on his back and is easily destroyed by Red Buster Powered Custom.
: An atypical techno-organic Metaloid that Enter created from a stag beetle and a wire fence via his enhanced power capable of turning insects and plants into Metaloids. Kugawataloid fights the Go-Busters until he is destroyed by Red Buster Powered Custom and Beet Buster.

Messiah Metaloids
Enter scatters them to the four winds to select their vessels and siphon a nearby Enetron source before absorbing enough data to become powerful enough to survive the Go-Busters' attacks, potentially allow Messiah to take over one of them, and transmit copies of their data to Messiah Card 13 as part of Enter's master plan.

: A Metaloid created from Messiah Card 01 infecting an hourglass who is equipped with a chest-mounted hourglass capable of creating sinkhole-like portals that allow him to assimilate anything caught within them and a Messiah-empowered right arm capable of creating barriers and shockwaves. He intends to assimilate Red Buster in order to become a true being, but is destroyed by the Go-Busters in their Powered Custom forms.
: A Metaloid created from Messiah Card 08 infecting a hand puppet who is equipped with the right arm-mounted , which allows him to take control of and analyze a living body, and a Messiah-empowered right leg that grants enhanced jumping and leaping capabilities. Enter tasks him with using his powers on Beet Buster so the former can better understand the Go-Busters before using his thrall to attack the city. However, Red Buster frees his comrade before turning into his Powered Custom form to destroy Puppetloid.
: A Metaloid created from Messiah Card 05 infecting a bulldozer who is equipped with tread-like legs and Messiah-empowered forearms that increase his dozer blade-like arms' destructive capabilities. He collects data on buildings' durability until he is destroyed by Red Buster Powered Custom via the Lio Blaster.
: A Metaloid created from Messiah Card 02 infecting a tiara who is equipped with a tiara-like boomerang, the ability to extract and digitize women's love, and a Messiah-empowered left arm that can create energy spheres from her nails. Enter deems her useless to his plot, but Escape takes Tiaraloid under her wing to help her better understand love. However, Tiaraloid is destroyed by Blue Buster Powered Custom.
: A giant Metaloid created from Messiah Card 11 infecting a stadium who is capable of disguising himself as the object that created him and trapping targets within his personal boxing ring-like pocket dimension. He traps Red Buster and Go-Buster Ace inside his subspace and pits him against his Megazord counterparts to collect combat data, but is destroyed by Go-Buster King.
: A Metaloid created from Messiah Card 03 infecting a pair of karate sparring gloves belonging to a boy named Kenta Sawai who is equipped with a Messiah-empowered left leg capable of moving too fast for the naked eye to perceive. Initially using Kenta to collect data on human fighting styles, Karateloid uses an Enetron tank to manifest his physical form and battle Blue Buster Powered Custom before the latter receives help from Yellow Buster Powered Custom and the Lio Blaster in destroying the Metaloid.
: A Metaloid created from Messiah Card 10 infecting a magnifying glass who possesses a gentleman thief-esque personality, a walking stick, shoulder-mounted Loupe Bazookas, and a Messiah-empowered right leg that grants enhanced speed and jumping capabilities. He extracts and digitizes data on human greed from collectors before he is eventually destroyed by the Go-Busters in their Powered Custom forms.
: A giant Metaloid created from Messiah Card 06 infecting Denshazord 2 who can disguise himself as a regular train and travel between the real world and subspace. He abducts people to gather data on despair and hope in order to reformat the Type-Delta Megazord within him into Megazord Zeta. Blue and Yellow Buster destroy Megazordloid's dynamo to rescue his hostages before Buster Hercules destroys the Metaloid, though Megazord Zeta emerges anyway.
: A hybrid Metaloid that Enter created from the male samurai-like , who was created from Messiah Card 09 infecting a katana, and the female knight-like , who was created from Messiah Card 12 infecting a shield. Enter tasks Kentateloid with collecting data on human rage by attacking the Go-Busters. While Red Buster controls his anger to defeat Kentateloid with the Lio Blaster Final Buster Mode, Enter uses the Messiah Cards to enhance the Type-Zeta Megazord.

Other Metaloids
: A Metaloid that Enter created from a compact disc via the  Metavirus who is equipped with a speaker capable of playing discordant sound. He is tasked with assisting Enter in taking control of the EMC's headquarters by weakening the Go-Busters' physical capabilities, but is destroyed by them.
: A Metaloid that Enter created from a factory pipe via the  Metavirus who can convert water into steam capable of rusting the unique alloy used in the Buddyloids, Buster Machines, and Megazords' construction. He is tasked with protecting a teleportation device that Enter secretly installed in the Tokyo Enetower to send the surrounding area into subspace, but is destroyed by the Go-Busters.
: A scrap metal-themed Metaloid that Enter created from previously destroyed Metaloids who is capable of switching out his limbs for those of other Metaloids and utilizing their abilities. He assists Enter until he is destroyed by Red and Beet Buster.

Megazords
The Megazords are giant robots built by the EMC during their early research into Enetron before Messiah took over the Megazords' programming and turned them against the EMC. Vaglass are capable of reformatting the Megazords by downloading a Metaloid's Metavirus, granting them the latter's attributes, and teleporting them from subspace to attack the city for its Enetron. The EMC developed three distinct Megazord models: the speed-oriented  that can summon Bugzords, the brute force-oriented , and the multi-purpose . Later in the series, Vaglass steals the BC-04's specs to develop the parasitic, destructive  model.

: A Type Beta Megazord created from Shovelloid's Metavirus that is equipped with the Metaloid's shovel arm and a powerful manipulator claw. It is deployed to siphon Enetron, but it is destroyed by Go-Buster Ace.
: A Type Alpha Megazord created from Burnerloid's Metavirus. It is deployed to obtain an Enetron tank, but it and its two Bugzords are destroyed by Go-Buster Ace.
: A modified Type Beta Megazord created from Needloid's Metavirus that can fire explosive needles. It is deployed to bring an Enetron tank into subspace, but it is destroyed by Go-Buster Ace.
: A Type Gamma Megazord created from Cutterloid's Metavirus that is equipped with Cutterloid's saw arm, the ability to project a force-field, absorb Enetron with its optics, and shoot missiles from its left hand. It is deployed to siphon Enetron and transmit it to subspace, with Enter shutting it down and abandoning it once the job is done. The EMC take the Cutterzord back for analysis, but Enter reactivates it to kill the Go-Busters. Despite receiving aid from the Sprayzord, both Megazords are destroyed by Go-BusterOh.
: A Type Alpha Megazord created from Tireloid's Metavirus that possesses superhuman strength, superhuman speed, and the ability to shoot energy blasts from its fingers. It is deployed to disrupt an Enetron transport convoy, but it is destroyed by Go-Buster Ace.
: A Type Beta Megazord created from Sprayloid's Metavirus equipped with the Metaloid's spray gun arm that is capable of spraying acidic mist. It is deployed to assist the Cutterzord in killing the Go-Busters, but both Megazords are destroyed by Go-BusterOh.
: A Type Alpha Megazord created from Denshaloid's Metavirus that is equipped with a chest laser and the ability to combine with its two Bugzords. It is deployed to deliver stolen Enetron to Vaglass, but it is destroyed by Go-BusterOh.
: A Type Alpha Megazord created from Drilloid's Metavirus that is equipped with the Metaloid's drill arms, which allow it burrow underground at superhuman speed, and lasers. It is deployed to attack the EMC and Enetron tanks from underground, but is destroyed by Go-BusterOh. As its Bugzords survived, Enter uses them in a later scheme until they are destroyed by the Buster Machines.
: A Type Gamma Megazord created from Danganloid's Metavirus that is equipped with a sword and a large gun. It is deployed to transport a Deltarium 39 crate into subspace, which it succeeds in before it is destroyed by Go-BusterOh.
: A Type Beta Megazord created from Fanloid's Metavirus that is equipped with the Metaloid's turbine along with powerful thrusters. It is deployed to siphon Enetron, but is destroyed by Go-Buster Ace.
: A Type Alpha Megazord created from Copyloid's Metavirus that is equipped with a high-grade camera and a holographic projector. It is deployed to thin out the Go-Busters' ranks while Copyloid steals Hong Kong actress Angie Sue's earrings, but it is destroyed by Go-BusterOh.
: A Type Alpha Megazord created from Tubaloid's Metavirus that is equipped with the Metaloid's ability to fire sonic blasts capable of marking targets. It successfully marks Go-Buster Ace for destruction by Tubazord 2 before it is destroyed by the former.
: A Type Beta Megazord created from Tubaloid 2's Metavirus that is equipped with multiple tubas of varying size, which are all capable of firing concussive sonic blasts and destroying anything the first Tubazord marked. It is deployed to destroy Go-Buster Ace, but it is damaged by the GT-02 Gorilla before it is destroyed by Go-BusterOh.
: A Type Gamma Megazord created from Soujikiloid's Metavirus that is equipped with a stronger version of the Metaloid's vacuum arm called the High Power Cleaner. It is deployed to steal an Enetron tank, but it is destroyed by Go-BusterOh.
: A Type Alpha Megazord created from Parabolaloid's Metavirus that is equipped with a VHF antenna that doubles as a spear. It is initially sent to steal an Enetron tank before Enter takes manual control of it and its Bugzords to attack the Go-Busters, though the Megazords are destroyed by Go-Buster Ace, the BC-04 Beetle, and the SJ-05 Stag Beetle.
: A Type Beta Megazord created from Forkloid's Metavirus that is equipped with a stronger version of the Metaloid's trident arm. It is deployed to transfer the newly developed Type Delta Megazord into reality while pretending to attack an Enetron tank before both Megazords are destroyed by the GT-02 Gorilla, the BC-04 Beetle, and the SJ-05 Stag Beetle.
: A Type Alpha Megazord created from Drilloid 2's Metavirus and an upgraded version of the previous model that is equipped with shoulder-mounted drills and four Bugzords. It is deployed 3,000 m underground to mine for untapped Enetron, but it is dragged to the surface and destroyed by Go-Buster Beet.
: A Type Gamma Megazord created from Spannerloid's Metavirus that is equipped with giant wrenches capable of disassembling other Megazords. It is deployed to release a Type Delta Megazord, but both are destroyed by Go-BusterOh and Buster Hercules.
: A Type Beta Megazord created from Filmloid's Metavirus that is capable of protecting a subspace bubble. While it is destroyed by Great Go-Buster, Enter recognizes Filmzord's potential and equips future Vaglass Megazords with copies of its subspace projector.
: A Type Beta Megazord created from Dumbbellloid's Metavirus that is equipped with a pair of dumbbells. Shortly after it is deployed, it is destroyed by the GT-02 Gorilla.
: A Type Alpha Megazord created from Keyloid's Metavirus that is equipped with the Metaloid's locking ability and Filmzord's subspace projector. It is deployed to kill the Go-Busters, but is destroyed by Great Go-Buster.
: A Type Gamma Megazord created from Jisyakuloid's Metavirus that is equipped with the Metaloid's magnetic abilities. It is deployed to siphon Enetron by magnetizing it, but Go-Buster Beet takes back the Enetron it stole before it is destroyed by Go-BusterOh.
: A Type Beta Megazord created from Wataameloid's Metavirus that is equipped with the Metaloid's cotton candy sticks, which can produce a sticky substance capable of directly siphoning Enetron from a tank, and the ability to produce energy waves from its head. It is deployed to siphon Enetron, but it is destroyed by Go-Buster Ace, Go-Buster Beet, and the SJ-05 Stag Beetle.
: A Type Alpha Megazord created from Rousokuloid's Metavirus equipped with the  flamethrower and a candlestick-like blade. It is sent to steal an Enetron tank, but it is destroyed by Buster Hercules.
: A Type Gamma Megazord created from Keshigomuloid's Metavirus that is equipped with the Metaloid's eraser arm. It is deployed to release a Type Delta Megazord and delete the Buster Machine's programming data, but it is destroyed by Go-BusterOh before it can succeed in the former task.
: A Type Beta Megazord created from Mushikagoloid's Metavirus that is equipped with the arm-mounted  and an upgraded version of Filmzord's subspace projector capable of compressing the projection. It is deployed to attack the Go-Busters, but they use Great Go-Buster to temporarily negate the subspace projection before destroying the Mushikagozord.
: A Type Alpha Megazord created from Sprayloid 2's Metavirus that is equipped with aerosol paint capable of disguising itself as a building. It is deployed to attack the Go-Busters, but it is destroyed by Buster Hercules with help from the EMC.
: A Type Gamma Megazord created from Danganloid 2's Metavirus that is equipped with a large left arm-mounted gun. It is deployed to attack the Go-Busters, but it is destroyed by Buster Hercules.
: A Type Gamma Megazord created from Parabolaloid 2's Metavirus that is equipped with a laser rifle. Shortly after it is deployed, it is destroyed by Go-Buster Ace and Go-Buster LiOh.
: A Type Alpha Megazord created from Denshaloid 2's Metavirus that is equipped with powerful armor and greater speed than the previous model. It is deployed so Enter can convert it into Megazordloid while it ostensibly steals an Enetron tank.
Due to the accidental nature of Omochiloid's creation, Omochizord lacks a purpose and acts randomly until it is destroyed by Go-Buster Beet, Tategami LiOh, and the SJ-05 Stag Beetle.
It is deployed to attack the Go-Busters until it is destroyed by Go-Buster Beet and SJ-05 Stag Beetle.

Messiah Megazords
 are stronger versions of the regular Vaglass Megazords. Unlike the previous iterations, Type Delta Megazords can be reformatted into a Messiah Megazord.

: A Type Alpha Megazord created from Sunadokeiloid's data that is equipped with a right arm-mounted drill capable of absorbing data and storing it in a left arm-mounted hourglass. It is deployed to kill the Go-Busters, but is destroyed by Buster Hercules.
: A Type Gamma Megazord created from Puppetloid's data that is equipped with the right arm-mounted , which allows it to control other Megazords. It is deployed to kill the Go-Busters, but it is destroyed by Go-BusterOh.
: A Type Delta Megazord created from Bulldozerloid's data that is equipped with the Metaloid's arms. It is deployed to attack the Go-Busters, but it is destroyed by Go-Buster LiOh.
: A Type Beta Megazord created from Tiaraloid's data that is capable of firing energy beams from its tiara, deploy tiara-shaped fighter jets, and flying. It is deployed to attack the Go-Busters, but it is destroyed by Go-Buster Ace and Tategami LiOh.
: A Type Alpha Megazord created from Domeloid's data that is equipped with a trident-like arm. Domeloid sends it in to obtain combat data on Go-Buster Ace, which destroys Domezord Alpha.
: A Type Beta Megazord created from  Domeloid's weightlifting data that is equipped with a large dumbbell. Domeloid sends it and Domezord Gamma to obtain combat data on Go-Buster Ace, which tricks the latter into destroying Domezord Beta.
: A Type Gamma Megazord created from Domeloid's kickboxing data. Domeloid sends it and Domezord Beta to obtain combat data on Go-Buster Ace, but Domezord Gamma is destroyed by Go-Buster King.
: A Type Delta Megazord created from Domeloid's boxing data. Domeloid sends it to assist Domezord Gamma, but it is destroyed by Go-Buster King.
: A Type Beta Megazord created from Karateloid's data that is equipped with increased punching power. It is deployed to attack the Go-Busters, but it is destroyed by Go-Buster Ace and Buster Hercules.
: A Type Alpha Megazord created from Loupeloid's data that is capable of easily stealing other Megazords' equipment. It is deployed to attack the Go-Busters, but it is destroyed by Buster Hercules and Tategami LiOh.
: A Type Gamma Megazord created from Kenloid's data that is equipped with the Metaloid's sword arm. It is deployed to attack the Go-Busters, but it is destroyed by GT-02 Gorilla, the RH-03 Rabbit, and Buster Hercules.
: A Type Delta Megazord created from Tateloid's data that is equipped with the Metaloid's shield. It is deployed to attack the Go-Busters, but it is destroyed by Tategami LiOh.

Other Megazords
: A Type Gamma Megazord created from CDloid's Metavirus. It is sent to steal an Enetron tank, but it is destroyed by Go-BusterOh. The CDzord appears exclusively in the special drama sessions of the series' first original soundtrack.

Sakurada family

Rika Sakurada
 is Hiromu's older sister. Because of her dislike of machines, she seldom visited the Transport Research Center. After learning of parents' disappearances, she refused to allow Hiromu to become a Go-Buster for fear of losing him as well. Upon learning that he did so anyway, she slowly grows to accept his decision and accept Cheeda Nick into her family.

In an alternate timeline where Messiah never came to exist, depicted in the V-Cinema special Tokumei Sentai Go-Busters Returns vs. Doubutsu Sentai Go-Busters, Rika idolizes Hiromu after he joins the Doubutsu Sentai Go-Busters team, was inspired by him to become unofficial member , and joined the Go-Busters in their final battle against the Mechalius Empire.

Yosuke Sakurada
Thirteen years prior to the series, he, his wife Michiko, and their scientists sacrificed themselves to trap Messiah in Subspace and were digitized into him. Despite this, Yosuke managed to retain some of his free will and makes contact with Masato Jin to aid Hiromu and the Go-Busters, who eventually succeed in destroying Messiah at Yosuke and the other digitized scientists' request.

Michiko Sakurada
 is Hiromu and Rika's mother and a staff member of the Transport Research Center before she sacrificed herself to trap Messiah in subspace 13 years ago.

Guest characters
Angie Sue: A popular Hong Kong actress who resembles Yoko and is targeted by Vaglass for her rare earrings. Angie Sue is portrayed by Arisa Komiya, who also portrays Yoko Usami.
: Yoko's mother who worked for the Transport Research Center as a Megazord pilot and engineer thirteen years prior to the series. Like the others involved, Kei was digitized and absorbed by Messiah. After Hiromu destroys Messiah at her behest, Kei's spirit briefly appears before Yoko.
: A Double Monster and member of the Space Mafia Makuu, an intergalactic crime syndicate that was defeated by the original Gavan, who possesses a built-in Axial Distorter on his chest that enables him to open a portal to Makuu Space. As one of the surviving members of the revived Makuu syndicate, Rhino Doubler escapes to Earth, but is pursued by Geki Jumonji, the current Gavan, and his partner Shelly and the Go-Busters. After forming a partnership with Enter, Rhino Doubler attempts to send smart individuals to Makuu Space and leave the dimwitted behind in the hopes that they will destroy themselves. After being killed by the Go-Busters and Gavan in Maku Space, Rhino Doubler's body is infected with the  Metavirus, causing him to be revived as a data-based giant and grant his Axial Distorter access to subspace so he can combine it with Makuu Space. However, Great Go-Buster and Electronic Starbeast Dol destroy Rhino Doubler before he can succeed.
: An organization from the Metal Hero series that protects Earth and the universe from otherworldly threats.
: A member of the Galactic Union Police who succeeded Retsu Ichijouji to become . After being tasked with pursuing Rhino Doubler, Jumonji receives the Go-Busters' aid in defeating the Space Mafia Makuu's remnants. During the events of the crossover film Kamen Rider × Super Sentai × Space Sheriff: Super Hero Taisen Z, Jumonji joins forces with the Super Sentai, Kamen Riders, and other members of the Galactic Union Police to stop Space Shocker from reviving Demon King Psycho.
: Jumonji's assistant from the Planet Bird who owns a visual illusion device that allows her to use "Laser Vision" and transform into a budgerigar.
: Professor Hazuki's daughter who initially believes the EMC sacrificed her father for their own means. After learning the truth, she supports the Go-Busters and entrusts them to carry on her father's legacy.

Spin-off exclusive characters
: A member of the Galactic Union Police and Geki Jumonji's senior who succeeded Den Iga to become  and appears exclusively in the crossover film Kamen Rider × Super Sentai × Space Sheriff: Super Hero Taisen Z. He assists Jumonji, Yoko Usami, and other heroes in combating the revived Space Mafia Makuu.
: A small robotic sphere and a fragment of the Demon King Psycho of the Space Crime Syndicate Madou, which the original Sharivan defeated decades ago, who appears exclusively in the crossover film Kamen Rider × Super Sentai × Space Sheriff: Super Hero Taisen Z. Becoming independent of Psycho's thoughts as Space Shocker made preparations for his resurrection, Psycholon disconnects himself and flees to Earth, where he loses his memory and befriends Yoko Usami. Space Shocker pursues Psycholon and integrate him into Psycho, but Yoko reaches the former, convincing him to fully separate himself, sacrificing himself in the process. After her allies destroy Psycho, they assure her that Psycholon can be repaired.
: A giant, scythe-wielding demon who appears exclusively in the V-Cinema special Tokumei Sentai Go-Busters Returns vs. Doubutsu Sentai Go-Busters. On New Year's Eve, 2012, Azazel arrives to destroy Earth, successfully killing the Go-Busters in the process. Using a wish he received from God due to being the one millionth death in 2012, Nick attempts to avert this by creating an alternate timeline where the Doubutsu Sentai Go-Busters fought evil instead, but Azazel kills them as well. Realizing both groups can defeat him, Nick uses his second wish to bring the alternate Go-Busters to the original timeline and help the original Go-Busters kill Azazel before he can destroy Earth.
: The Judeo-Christian deity of the same name who resembles Enter and appears before Nick to grant him a wish as a reward for being the one millionth death in 2012. God is portrayed by Syo Jinnai, who also portrays Enter.
: A group of androids that appear exclusively in the V-Cinema special Tokumei Sentai Go-Busters Returns vs. Doubutsu Sentai Go-Busters. In an alternate timeline that Nick created to remove Messiah, the Mechalius Empire emerged in Vaglass' place to destroy all organic life, only to be opposed by the Doubutsu Sentai Go-Busters.
: The leader of the Mechalius Empire and Escape's counterpart who is eventually destroyed by the Go-Busters. Trange Star is portrayed by Ayame Misaki, who also portrays Escape.
: The Mechalius Empire's robotic soldiers and the Metaloids' counterparts:
: An excavator-themed monster and Shovelloid's counterpart. He is defeated by the Go-Busters, enlarged by Mainteloader, and destroyed by Go-Buster Animal.
: A wrench-themed monster and Spannerloid's counterpart who enlarges his fellow Loaders with an oil pump containing . Maintainloader is voiced by an uncredited voice actor.
: The sixth member of the Doubutsu Sentai Go-Busters who can transform into  and appears exclusively in the V-Cinema special Tokumei Sentai Go-Busters Returns vs. Doubutsu Sentai Go-Busters. After joining the Go-Busters in their battle against the Mechalius Empire, he competes with Hiromu for Yoko's affections until Doumyoji is killed in action. With his dying breath, he tells Hiromu to take care of Yoko for him before dying in his arms. Atsushi Doumyoji is portrayed by Tatsuhisa Suzuki, who also voices Usada Lettuce.

Notes

References

Super Sentai characters